The École nationale du génie de l'eau et de l'environnement de Strasbourg (ENGEES) is a French engineering college created in 1952.

Its primary vocation is to train engineers and executives whose skills are exercised in the following fields: management of hydrosystems, development of aquatic ecosystems, protection of water resources, design and sizing of water and sanitation networks, design and sizing of treatment equipment, management and operation of services and equipment, coastal hydraulic engineering, management of waste collection and treatment services (domestic and industrial).

Located in Strasbourg, the ENGEES is a public higher education institution part of the University of Strasbourg. The school is a member of the Conférence des Grandes Écoles (CGE).

Notable alumni 
 Sue Nabi, an Algerian-born French entrepreneur and innovator in the world of global beauty

References

External links
 ENGEES

Engineering universities and colleges in France
Strasbourg
ENGEES
Educational institutions established in 1952
1952 establishments in France